The Chapungu Sculpture Park is a sculpture park in Msasa, Harare, Zimbabwe, which displays the work of Zimbabwean stone sculptors.  It was founded in 1970 by Roy Guthrie, who was instrumental in promoting the work of its sculptors worldwide. One way this was done was by exhibiting the sculptures in Botanical Gardens in a touring exhibition called "Chapungu: Custom and Legend — A Culture in Stone". The places visited include:

(1999) Kirstenbosch National Botanical Garden, Cape Town, South Africa
(2000) Royal Botanical Gardens, Kew, London, United Kingdom,
(2001) Missouri Botanical Garden, St Louis, USA
(2001) Boyce Thompson Arboretum State Park, Superior, USA
(2002) Red Butte Garden and Arboretum, Salt Lake City, USA
(2003) Garfield Park Conservatory, Chicago, USA
(2003) Chicago Botanic Garden, Chicago USA
(2004) Denver Botanic Gardens, Denver, USA

Artists
Among the artists whose works can be seen at the park are:
Dominic Benhura
Crispen Chakanyuka
Square Chikwanda
Sanwell Chirume
Stanford Derere
Arthur Fata
Barankinya Gotsa
Tapfuma Gutsa
Chrispen June
Makina Kameya
Biggie Kapeta
Royal Katiyo
Samson Kuvengura
Derek Macheka
Colleen Madamombe
Fabian Madamombe
Wazi Maicolo
Amali Mailolo
Damian Manhuwa
Josia Manzi
Joram Mariga
Eddie Masaya
Moses Masaya
Passmore Mashaya
Bernard Matemera
Boira Mteki
Bryn Mteki
Richard Mteki
Sylvester Mubayi
Thomas Mukarobgwa
Nicholas Mukomberanwa
Joseph Muli
Henry Munyaradzi
Joe Mutasa
Tendai Mutasa
Joseph Muzondo
Joseph Ndandarika
Locardia Ndandarika
Agnes Nyanhongo
Euwit Nyanhongo
Gedion Nyanhongo
Brighton Sango
Amos Supuni
Bernard Takawira
John Takawira
Lazarus Takawira
The park is home to the Chapungu Sculpture Centre, which hosts an important residency program that allows young sculptors to work on their craft for two years under its aegis; many of the sculptors whose work is shown in the park began their careers at the Centre. 
Another Chapungu Sculpture Park was created in 2007 in the United States, along with a gallery, in Loveland, Colorado.

See also
Sculpture of Zimbabwe
Photographs of sculptures in the park

Zimbabwean art
Parks in Zimbabwe
Sculpture gardens, trails and parks in Africa
Art galleries established in 1970
1970 establishments in Rhodesia